The 1990 Winnipeg Blue Bombers season was the 33rd season for the team in the Canadian Football League and their 58th overall. The Blue Bombers finished in 1st place in the East Division with a 12–6 record, which was also the best record in the league that year. The Blue Bombers defeated the Toronto Argonauts in the East Final and then defeated the Edmonton Eskimos in the championship game to win the 78th Grey Cup in the first ever Grey Cup match-up of prairie teams.

Offseason

CFL Draft

Preseason

Regular season

Season standings

Season schedule

Playoffs

Schedule

East Final

Grey Cup

Awards and records
CFL's Most Outstanding Defensive Player Award – Greg Battle (LB)
CFL's Coach of the Year – Mike Riley

1990 CFL All-Stars
RB – Robert Mimbs
OT – Chris Walby
LB – Greg Battle
CB – Less Browne
CB – Rod Hill
P – Bob Cameron

References

Winnipeg Blue Bombers seasons
James S. Dixon Trophy championship seasons
Grey Cup championship seasons
Winn